The 1882 Worcester Worcesters finished with an 18–66 record, last place in the National League. The team folded after the  season. In a game on September 6, the team had only six fans in attendance a number that held the record for the smallest crowd in Major League history until 2015 when the Baltimore riots caused a game to be held "closed to the public."

Regular season

Season standings

Record vs. opponents

Roster

Player stats

Batting

Starters by position
Note: Pos = Position; G = Games played; AB = At bats; H = Hits; Avg. = Batting average; HR = Home runs; RBI = Runs batted in

Other batters
Note: G = Games played; AB = At bats; H = Hits; Avg. = Batting average; HR = Home runs; RBI = Runs batted in

Pitching

Starting pitchers
Note: G = Games pitched; IP = Innings pitched; W = Wins; L = Losses; ERA = Earned run average; SO = Strikeouts

Other pitchers
Note: G = Games pitched; IP = Innings pitched; W = Wins; L = Losses; ERA = Earned run average; SO = Strikeouts

References

1882 Worcester Worcesters season at Baseball Reference

Worcester Ruby Legs seasons
Worcester Worcesters season
Worcester